A Registered Aboriginal Party (RAP) is a recognised representative body of an Aboriginal Australian people per the Aboriginal Heritage Act 2006 (Vic.), whose function is to protect and manage the Aboriginal cultural heritage in the state of Victoria in Australia.

Function
Registered Aboriginal Parties act as the "primary guardians, keepers and knowledge holders of Aboriginal cultural heritage" in Victoria.

They are the approximate equivalent to land councils (mostly in the Northern Territory) or  Aboriginal or Indigenous corporations in the other states. If the body registers a claim with the National Native Title Tribunal under the Native Title Act 1993 (Cwth), they are referred to as a prescribed body corporate (PBC) until such time as a determination is made, when they become a Registered Native Title Body Corporate, or RNTBC, registered with the Office of the Registrar of Indigenous Corporations under the  Corporations (Aboriginal and Torres Strait Islander) Act 2006 (Cwth).

According to the Department of Premier and Cabinet:

Current RAPs

Aboriginal people apply to the Victorian Aboriginal Heritage Council (VAHC), who determines which applicants will be registered as Registered Aboriginal Parties (RAPs).

, there are 11 registered parties, covering about 74% of Victoria:

 Barengi Gadjin Land Council Aboriginal Corporation
 Bunurong Land Council Aboriginal Corporation
 Dja Dja Wurrung Clans Aboriginal Corporation
 Eastern Maar Aboriginal Corporation
 First People of the Millewa Mallee Aboriginal Corporation
 Gunaikurnai Land and Waters Aboriginal Corporation
 Gunditj Mirring Traditional Owners Aboriginal Corporation
 Taungurung Clans Aboriginal Corporation
 Wathaurung Aboriginal Corporation
 Wurundjeri Woi Wurrung Cultural Heritage Aboriginal Corporation
 Yorta Yorta Nation Aboriginal Corporation

See also
 Aboriginal sites of Victoria
 Victorian Aboriginal Heritage Register

References

External links
 

Heritage registers in Australia
History of Victoria (Australia)
Archaeology of Australia
Government research
Australian Aboriginal culture